
Year 895 (DCCCXCV) was a common year starting on Wednesday (link will display the full calendar) of the Julian calendar.

Events 
 By place 
 Europe 
 The Magyars are expelled from southern Russia, and settle in the Carpathian Basin, under the leadership of Árpád (The traditional date of 896 held during the 20th century has proved to be erroneous). Emperor Leo VI (the Wise) seeks aid from the Magyars, and after crossing the Danube on Byzantine ships, they ravage Bulgarian territory.
 Simeon I (the Great), ruler (khan) of the Bulgarian Empire, seeks refuge in the fortress of Drastar, while the Magyars reach the outskirts of the capital Preslav. Facing a difficult situation with war on two fronts, Simeon calls for a truce. Leo VI sends the diplomat Leo Choirosphaktes to Bulgaria, to negotiate the terms.
 King Odo (or Eudes) takes a large army against Rheims, and forces anti-king Charles the Simple to flee to Germany. King Arnulf of Carinthia, throwing off his agreements with Odo, charges his illegitimate son Zwentibold to invade the West Frankish Kingdom, and re-install Charles on the throne.
 May – Arnulf of Carinthia summons the Imperial Diet in his residence at Worms. Angered by the non-appearance of Charles the Simple, he again supports Odo's claim to the throne of the West Frankish Kingdom. In the same assembly, he crowns Zwentibold as king of Lotharingia.
 Guy IV, duke of Spoleto, conquers Benevento (after the Byzantines have moved the capital of Byzantine Italy from Benevento to Bari). Guy makes himself prince, thereby uniting the two Italian states. The Byzantines attempt to retake Benevento, but are defeated by Lombard troops.
 December – Arnulf of Carinthia invades Italy, at the head of an East Frankish expeditionary army. He arrives in Pavia and reorganizes the Lombard state. Arnulf partitions the northern part of the kingdom: the western half (March of Lombardy) and the eastern half (March of Verona).
 Arnulf of Carinthia crosses the Po River and divides his army in two: one corps (Swabian) proceeds to Florence (via Bologna), while the other corps (Franks) moves through the Lunigiana to the precincts of Rome.
 Spytihněv I, duke of Bohemia, together with the Slavník prince Witizla, breaks away from Great Moravia, and swears allegiance to Arnulf of Carinthia in Regensburg.

 Britain 
 King Anarawd of Gwynedd is supplied with English troops, to assist in his reconquest of Seisyllwg (Wales). He is successful, and his brother Cadell is finally able to take his rightful place on the Seisyllwg throne.
 Autumn – King Alfred the Great blockades the Lea River and builds fortifications, trapping the Danish Vikings at Hertford. They abandon their longships and escape to Bridgnorth, located in the Severn Valley.

 Arabian Empire 
 Hamdan ibn Hamdun, a Taghlibi Arab chieftain, is defeated and captured by Caliph Al-Mu'tadid at the fortress of Mardin (near modern Cizre). Hamdan's son Husayn enters Abbasid service, beginning the rise of the Hamdanid Dynasty.

 Mexico 
 Birth of Topiltzin, future emperor of the Toltec Empire, in Michatlauhco, modern-day Morelos (approximate date).

 By topic 

 Music 
 The Musica enchiriadis is composed, marking the beginning of western polyphonic music (approximate date).

Births 
 March 4 – Liu Zhiyuan, founder of the Later Han (d. 948)
 Al-Muqtadir, caliph of the Abbasid Caliphate (d. 932)
 Gérard of Brogne, Frankish abbot (approximate date)
 Liu Chong, founder of the Northern Han (approximate date)
 Odo of Wetterau, German nobleman (approximate date)
 Sancho Ordóñez, king of Galicia (approximate date)
 Su Yugui, Chinese official and chancellor (d. 956)

Deaths 
 May 16 – Qian Kuan, Chinese nobleman
 June 4 – Li Xi, chancellor of the Tang Dynasty
 August 24 – Guthred, king of Northumbria
 October 1 – Kong Wei, chancellor of the Tang Dynasty
 Fujiwara no Yasunori, Japanese nobleman (b. 825)
 Gerolf of Holland, count of Friesland (or 896)
 Hugh, Frankish duke and illegitimate son of Lothair II 
 Li Kuangchou, Chinese warlord (approximate date)
 Lu Xisheng, chancellor of the Tang Dynasty
 Minamoto no Tōru, Japanese poet (b. 822)
 Muiredach mac Eochocáin, king of Ulaid (Ireland)
 Wang Chongying, Chinese warlord and governor
 Wang Chucun, general of the Tang Dynasty (b. 831)
 Wang Xingyu, Chinese warlord (approximate date)
 Wei Zhaodu, chancellor of the Tang Dynasty
 Wulfred, bishop of Lichfield (approximate date)

References